Hulbert may refer to:

People with the given name 
Hulbert Footner (1879–1944), Canadian crime fiction writer

Places

Australia 

 Hulbert, Queensland, a town

United States 
Hulbert, Oklahoma
Hulbert Township, Michigan

Other uses
Hulbert (surname)
USS Hulbert (DD-342), U.S. Navy ship named in honor of Henry L. Hulbert, USMC